This article documents expected notable spaceflight events during the year 2026.

NASA's Nancy Grace Roman Space Telescope, which will have a field of view 100 times larger than that of the Hubble Space Telescope, is scheduled to be launched in October 2026.

China plans to launch Chang'e 7 to explore the lunar south pole in late 2026. The mission will include an orbiter, a relay satellite, a lander, a rover, and a mini-flying probe.

Orbital launches 

|colspan=8 style="background:white;"|

March 
|-

|colspan=8 style="background:white;"|

June 
|-

|colspan=8 style="background:white;"|

September 
|-

|colspan=8 style="background:white;"|

October 
|-

|colspan=8 style="background:white;"|

December 
|-

|colspan=8 style="background:white;"|

To be determined 
|-

|}

Suborbital flights 

|}

Deep-space rendezvous

Extravehicular activities (EVAs)

Orbital launch statistics

By country 
For the purposes of this section, the yearly tally of orbital launches by country assigns each flight to the country of origin of the rocket, not to the launch services provider or the spaceport. For example, Soyuz launches by Arianespace in Kourou are counted under Russia because Soyuz-2 is a Russian rocket.

By rocket

By family

By type

By configuration

By spaceport

By orbit

Expected maiden flights 
 Razor Crest Mk-1 – EtherealX – India
 Long March 5DY – CASC – China
 Amur – Roscosmos – Russia
 Vega-E – Arianespace – Europe

Notes

References

External links

 
Spaceflight by year